The 2011 Montedio Yamagata season is Montedio Yamagata's third consecutive season in J. League Division 1. It also includes the 2011 J. League Cup, and the 2011 Emperor's Cup.

Players

Competitions

J. League

League table

Matches

Results by round

J. League Cup

Emperor's Cup

References

Montedio Yamagata
Montedio Yamagata seasons